Sun Hill is an unincorporated community in Washington County, in the U.S. state of Georgia.

History
The name Sun Hill was adopted when the railroad was extended to the site. A post office called Sun Hill was established in 1872, and remained in operation until 1930. A variant name is "Sunhill".

References

Unincorporated communities in Georgia (U.S. state)
Unincorporated communities in Washington County, Georgia